Ranulf de Glanvill (alias Glanvil,  Glanville, Granville, etc., died 1190) was Chief Justiciar of England during the reign of King Henry II (1154–89) and was the probable author of Tractatus de legibus et consuetudinibus regni Anglie (The Treatise on the Laws and Customs of the Kingdom of England), the earliest treatise on the laws of England.

Political and legal career
We have no primary sources citing when or where he was born. He is first heard of as Sheriff of Yorkshire, Warwickshire and Leicestershire from 1163 to 1170 when, along with the majority of High Sheriffs, he was removed from office for corruption. 

However, in 1173, he was appointed Sheriff of Lancashire and custodian of the honour of Richmond. In 1174, when he was Sheriff of Westmorland, he was one of the English leaders at the Battle of Alnwick, and it was to him that the king of Scotland, William the Lion, surrendered. 

In 1175, he was reappointed Sheriff of Yorkshire, in 1176 he became justice of the king's court and a justice itinerant in the northern circuit, and in 1180 Chief Justiciar of England. It was with his assistance that Henry II completed his famous judicial reforms, though many had been carried out before he came into office. He became the king's right-hand man, and during Henry's frequent absences was in effect regent of England. In 1176, he was also made custodian of Queen Eleanor, who was confined to her quarters in Winchester Castle.

After the death of Henry in 1189, Glanvill was removed from his office by Richard I on 17 September 1189 and imprisoned until he had paid a ransom, according to one authority, of £15,000. Shortly after obtaining his freedom he took the cross, and he died at the siege of Acre in 1190.

He founded two monasteries, both in Suffolk: Butley Priory, for Black Canons, was founded in 1171, and Leiston Abbey, for White Canons, in 1183. He also built a leper hospital at Somerton, in Norfolk.

Marriage and progeny

Ranulf married Bertha de Valoignes, daughter of Theobald de Valoines, lord of the manor of Parham, Suffolk, by whom he had three daughters:
 Matilda (Maud) de Glanville, who married Sir William de Auberville of Westenhanger, Kent: they were the founders of Langdon Abbey in Kent.
 Ammabil (Mabel) de Glanville, who married a certain de Arden.
 Helewis de Glanville, who married Robert fitz Ralph fitz Ribald: she was the foundress of Swainby Abbey, which was afterwards moved to Coverham Abbey, North Yorkshire.

Tractatus de legibus

Perhaps at the instigation of Henry II, Glanvill wrote or oversaw the writing of Tractatus de legibus et consuetudinibus regni Anglie (The Treatise on the Laws and Customs of the Kingdom of England), a practical discourse on the forms of procedure in the king's court, which was often known simply as Glanvill.  As the source of our knowledge regarding the earliest form of the curia regis, and for the information it affords regarding ancient customs and laws, it is of great value to the student of English history. It is now generally agreed that the work of Glanvill is of earlier date than the Scottish law book known from its first words as Regiam Majestatem, which bears a close resemblance to his.

The treatise of Glanvill was first printed in 1554. An English translation, with notes and introduction by John Beames, was published at London in 1812. A French version is found in various manuscripts, but has not yet been printed. The treatise was then edited and translated by G.D.G. Hall for the Oxford University Press in 1965.

The authorship of the Tractatus, while certainly within the sphere of Ranulf, is debated, other candidates for its authorship or co-authorship including Ranulf's nephews Hubert Walter (Chief Justiciar and Lord Chancellor of England under Richard I) and Osbert fitzHervey.

Notes

References
 British History Online Deans of York accessed on 10 September 2007
 Powicke, F. Maurice and E. B. Fryde Handbook of British Chronology 2nd. ed. London: Royal Historical Society 1961

Further reading
 R. Mortimer, 'The family of Rannulf de Glanville', Bulletin of the Institute of Historical Research Vol. 54 (1981), pp. 1–16.
 R.V. Turner, 'The reputation of royal judges under the Angevin kings', Albion 11 part 4 (winter 1979), pp. 301–16.
 R.V. Turner, 'Religious patronage of Angevin royal administrators, c. 1170-1239', Albion 18 part 1 (Spring 1986), pp. 1–21.

External links
 

Caveat
 W.U.C. Glanville-Richards, Records of the Anglo-Norman House of Glanville from A.D. 1050 to 1880 (Mitchell & Hughes, London 1882) (Google). "much of this is incorrect or very questionable" - F.W. Maitland, c. 1890. "little reliance can be placed on this work" - C.W. David, 1936. See: C.J. Wright, 'The man who wrote on the manuscripts in the British Museum', British Library Journal 1986, pp. 76-85 (British Library pdf).

People from Suffolk Coastal (district)
Justiciars of England
Christians of the Third Crusade
Year of birth unknown
1110s births
1190 deaths
12th-century English judges
12th-century Latin writers
Anglo-Normans
High Sheriffs of Westmorland
High Sheriffs of Lancashire
High Sheriffs of Yorkshire
High Sheriffs of Warwickshire
High Sheriffs of Leicestershire
12th-century English writers